The Deadlys Awards 2000, were an annual celebration of Australian Aboriginal and Torres Strait Islander achievement in music, sport, entertainment and community.

Music
Excellence In Film or Theatrical Score: Wesley Enoch - The Sunshine Club
Outstanding Contribution to Aboriginal Music: Tiddas
Most Promising New Talent: Stiff Gins
Male Artist of the Year: Troy Cassar-Daley
Female Artist of the Year: Ruby Hunter
Album Release of the Year: Yothu Yindi - Garma
Single Release: Christine Anu - "Sunshine On A Rainy Day"
Band of the Year: NoKTuRNL

Community
Aboriginal Broadcaster of the Year: Grant Hansen 3CR 855am/3 K'N'D

External links
Deadlys 2000 winners at Vibe

The Deadly Awards
2000 in Australian music
Indigenous Australia-related lists